Alonzo P. "Lon" Knight, born Alonzo P. Letti (June 16, 1853 – April 23, 1932), was an American right fielder, right-handed pitcher and manager in Major League Baseball. He threw the first pitch in the first game played in the new National League on April 22, 1876.

Early life and education
He was born in Philadelphia and attended Girard College at age 9 after his father died of typhoid fever. At Girard College, he changed his last name from Letti to Knight possibly to avoid ethnic hostility toward Italians. After graduation, he worked for a brief time as an accountant.

Career
He began playing with the Philadelphia Athletics in  when the team was in the National Association, then stayed with them when they joined the National League in 1876. When the team folded after the 1876 season, he did not play in the major leagues again until 1880, when he joined the Worcester Ruby Legs of the NL for one season, and the Detroit Wolverines for two. In , he was named the manager of the Philadelphia Athletics of the American Association, and the team won the league pennant with Knight also playing right field. In 1884 the team fell back to seventh place in a 13-team league. He finished his career in 1885 when he split the season between the Athletics and the Providence Grays.

On May 21, 1880, he was playing right field at Riverside Park in Albany, New York when Lip Pike hit a ball over the fence and into the river. Few parks at the time had ground rules concerning balls hit over the fence. It was not an automatic home run, so Knight pursued the ball in a boat, eventually giving up.

On July 30, 1883, Knight "hit for the cycle" against Pittsburgh and is credited with the first ever natural-cycle in baseball.

After Knight's playing career ended, he was an umpire for several seasons; his most active year was 1890, when he officiated 123 games in the Players' League. He umpired a total of 212 major league games.

Knight died of poisoning at age 78 in Philadelphia when the gas line to the heater in his house leaked. He is interred at Laurel Hill Cemetery in an unmarked grave in Section H, Lot 63–64.

See also
 List of Major League Baseball players to hit for the cycle
 List of Major League Baseball single-game hits leaders
 List of Major League Baseball player-managers

References

External links
, or Retrosheet

 Lon Knight at SABR (Baseball BioProject)

1853 births
1932 deaths
19th-century baseball players
Accidental deaths in Pennsylvania
American people of Italian descent
Baseball managers
Baseball players from Philadelphia
Binghamton Crickets (1880s) players
Burials at Laurel Hill Cemetery (Philadelphia)
Deaths by poisoning
Detroit Wolverines players
Lowell (minor league baseball) players
Major League Baseball pitchers
Major League Baseball player-managers
Major League Baseball right fielders
Philadelphia Athletics (AA) managers
Philadelphia Athletics (AA) players
Philadelphia Athletics (NA) players
Philadelphia Athletics (NL) players
Providence Grays players
Rochester Maroons players
Worcester Grays players
Worcester Ruby Legs players